Aurangabad , is a domestic airport located in Aurangabad, Maharashtra, Maharashtra, India. It is located about 5.5 km east of the city centre, and 11 km from Aurangabad Railway Station, along the Aurangabad-Nagpur State Highway. The airport is owned and operated by the Airports Authority of India, with one passenger terminal with 190,000 square-feet floor area.The terminal has 2 jet bridges.

Airlines and destinations

Accidents and incidents
 On 26 April 1993, Indian Airlines Flight 491 (IC 491), a Boeing 737-2A8 (registered VT-ECQ) was on its connecting route from Delhi to Mumbai with en route stops at Jaipur, Udaipur and Aurangabad. The heavily laden aircraft started its takeoff from Aurangabad's runway 09 in hot and humid temperatures. After lifting off almost at the end of the runway, it impacted heavily with a lorry on a highway at the end of the runway. The left main landing gear, left engine bottom cowling and thrust reverser impacted the left side of the truck at a height of nearly seven feet from the level of the road. Thereafter the aircraft hit high tension power lines nearly 3 km northeast of the runway and hit the ground. The aircraft was carrying 112 passengers and six crew members. 63 persons including the pilot, the co-pilot and two other members of the crew survived. 53 passengers and two members of the crew died.

References

External links 
Aurangabad Airport at the Airports Authority of India
ww.jica.go.jp (Ajanta–Ellora Conservation and Tourism Development Project.)

Transport in Aurangabad, Maharashtra
Airports in Maharashtra
Buildings and structures in Aurangabad, Maharashtra
Year of establishment missing